The Gold Museum of Peru and Weapons of the World is a Peruvian museum, located in Lima.

History 
In the 1960s, Miguel Mujica Gallo used his private collection, gathered throughout his life, to open the "Gold Museum of Peru and Weapons of the World", located in the district of Santiago de Surco. It is in a two-story building made of reinforced concrete and accessed through a vault-style entrance.

The museum was donated to the state of Perú by Gallo and is now administered by Foundation Miguel Mujica Gallo, which is currently directed by Victoria Mujica Diez Canseco.

Collection

Gold of Peru 
Gallo's acquisition of more than seven thousand artifacts was inspired by an admiration for Peruvian history. He desired to leave a legacy to this country as homage to the Peruvian pre-Columbian cultures in its various manifestations, containing materials such as precious metals like gold, silver and some of platinum, multiple textiles, ceramics, mummies and other valuable objects.

The collection demonstrates what the Spanish found when they came to South America, resulting in fighting between the ancient Peruvians and the Spanish. The collection is valued at over $10 million. The works were found mostly in the Republican era and acquired at the time by They demonstrated advances in metallurgy, customs, beliefs and life.

Gold and silver are ubiquitous in the complex religious and magical symbolism of Peruvian cultures. For pre-Inca civilizations, these metals represented the sun-moon, day-night, male-female duality. In the Inca Empire, the sun god or Inti represented sovereignty on the divine plane and Mama Killa ("mother moon"), the moon goddess, was Inti's wife, mother of the sky. The Temple of the Sun is an order of priestesses.

The forms that these metals acquired indicated the seniority and power of those who used them and their importance for burials. The ancient Peruvians developed techniques unknown to Europeans at the time, such as adding color to other metal surfaces with gold or silver plating.

Four pre-Incan cultures stood out at the highest level of goldsmithy. They are Vicus, Moche, Sican and Chimu that developed on the northern coast of Peru. The Inca Empire was richer in possession of metal objects in gold and silver and the quality and finesse of its finished than its predecessors.

Victoria Mujica, referring to historical documents found in the Archive of the Indies, cites one that says:

Arms of the world

Gallo also collected weapons from around the world. The oldest dated from the 13th century.

Twenty thousand weapons of all times and countries are exhibited in the museum. This collection is one of the world's foremost, for its quantity, quality, superb condition and the famous original holders.

The collection also includes military uniforms, saddles, armor, spurs and other objects that define the early through time and characters of history for more than three thousand and three hundred years.

Controversy 
In the early 2000s, accusations arose that a vast majority of gold pieces in the museum were false. The BBC reported that "The Consumer Defense Institute has examined 4,257 artifacts from the Peruvian Museum of Gold and concluded they were 'false without a shadow of a doubt'.

References

External links

 Official Website Museum Gold of Peru and Weapons of the World

Museums in Lima
Archaeological museums in Peru
Pre-Columbian art museums
Gold museums